The following lists events in the year 2022 in South Korea.

Incumbents

Events
 11 January – In an apartment which was in construction in Gwangju, the outer wall collapsed, trapping 6 workers, later 1 was found dead.
 9 March – 2022 South Korean presidential election: 20th Republic of Korea presidential election was held on 9 March 2022. It is the eighth presidential election since democratization. Yoon Suk-yeol narrowly won the 2022 presidential election.
 1 June – 2022 South Korean local and by-elections. President Yoon's party, the People Power Party, decisively won the local elections.
 9 June – Daegu office fire
 8 August – 2022 South Korean floods
 29 October – Seoul Halloween crowd crush: at least 156 people are killed and 172 people are injured after a large crowd of people are crushed in a narrow street.

Holidays
As per in the [Presidential Decree No. 28394, 2017. 10. 17., partially amended], the following days are declared holidays in South Korea:
 1 January – New Year's Day
 1 February to 3 February – Korean New Year
 1 March – March 1st Movement Day
 5 May – Children's Day South Korea
 8 May – Buddha's Birthday
 6 June – Memorial Day
 15 August – National Liberation Day
 9 September to 11 September – Chuseok
 3 October – National Foundation Day
 9 October – Hangul Day
 25 December – Christmas Day

Arts and entertainment
 List of South Korean films of 2022
 List of 2022 box office number-one films in South Korea
 23rd Jeonju International Film Festival - April 28 – May 7, 2022
 26th Bucheon International Fantastic Film Festival – July 7 – 17
 27th Busan International Film Festival – October 5 – 14
 2022 MBC Entertainment Awards
 2022 SBS Entertainment Awards
 2022 KBS Drama Awards
 2022 MBC Drama Awards
 2022 SBS Drama Awards

Deaths

 5 January – Kim Mi-soo, 29 (31 in Korean age), actress
 26 March – Bang Jun-seok, 52, film score composer and music director
 7 May – Kang Soo-yeon, 55, actress
 8 June – Song Hae, 95, television music show host and singer

References

 
South Korea
South Korea
2020s in South Korea
Years of the 21st century in South Korea